Leathernecks is a 1989 Italian  Vietnam  war film  directed  by Ignazio Dolce (credited as Paul D. Robinson) and starring Richard Hatch.

Plot
A special military unit called the Leathernecks travel to a Vietnamese village to teach the inhabitants how to defend themselves against the enemy.

Cast
Richard Hatch
Antonio Marsina
James Mitchum
Tanya Gomez
Vassili Karis

References

External links

1980s war films
Macaroni Combat films
English-language Italian films
Vietnam War films
Films scored by Stefano Mainetti
Films shot in the Philippines
1980s English-language films
1980s Italian films